The 2008–09 UCLA Bruins men's basketball team opened the season on November 3 when it took on Cal Baptist in an exhibition game in Pauley Pavilion. The Bruins participated in the 2K Sports Classic, Big 12/Pac-10 Hardwood Series, and the John R. Wooden Classic in the Honda Center.

The team opened the season with the following starters: Alfred Aboya (Center), James Keefe (Power forward), Josh Shipp (Small forward), Jrue Holiday (Shooting guard) and Darren Collison (Point guard).

The team opted not to have an October 17, 2008 Midnight Madness celebration this year. Practices began on Saturday, October 18, as they prepared for the first exhibition game on Monday, November 3. The team has been picked to finish first in the Pac-10 conference again, over Arizona State, USC and Arizona.

Freshman Tyler Trapani (#4), great-grandson of former head coach John Wooden, had joined the team.

Three players from last season's team, Russell Westbrook, Kevin Love and Luc Richard Mbah a Moute were chosen to play in the NBA. Westbrook was picked by the Seattle SuperSonics as the fourth overall pick, while Love was the fifth pick by the Memphis Grizzlies, and Mbah a Moute was picked by the Milwaukee Bucks, the 37th pick in the NBA draft.

The team finished the season by losing to Villanova 89–69 in the second round of the 2009 NCAA Division I men's basketball tournament. The senior class of  Alfred Aboya, Darren Collison and Josh Shipp finished their careers with the most wins in school history with 123  The distinction was relative, as John Wooden's legendary teams played shorter seasons and freshmen were ineligible.

Highlights
During half-time of the January 31 game against Stanford, the Bruins' 1963–64 and 1964–65 National Championship teams were honored, along with their 98-year-old former coach John R. Wooden, who told the crowd that he can still remember those years. The game also marked the Coaches vs. Cancer Suits and Sneakers Awareness Weekend with both teams wore white sneakers with their suits and ties.

A week later at the Notre Dame game, Troy Aikman was honored for his induction into the College Football Hall of Fame and for having recently completed his courses for a degree in sociology during half-time. A plaque was presented to Aikman to be permanently displayed at UCLA's Hall of Fame.

 Most points in a game – 113, UCLA vs. Wyoming, December 23, 2008
 2nd most field goals made – 41, UCLA vs. Wyoming, December 23, 2008
 Most 3-point FG made – 33 (tie), UCLA vs. Loyola Marymount, December 17, 2008
 Highest 3-pt percentage – .733 (11–15), UCLA vs. Stanford, January 29, 2009
 Most steals – 20, UCLA vs. Wyoming, December 23, 2008
 Most turnovers – 24, UCLA vs. Prairie View A&M, November 12, 2008

Seniors Alfred Aboya and Darren Collison played more games for UCLA than any other player in history, passing Mitchell Butler's 130 games from 1990–93.

The 72–54 DePaul victory in the December 13, 2008 John R. Wooden Classic game was coach Ben Howland's 300th career victory.

Sidney Wicks and his 1968–69 championship team were honored during halftime of the final home game against Oregon on Saturday, March 7, 2009.

These former players are now playing on an NBA team: Jason Kapono, Arron Afflalo, Dan Gadzuric, Luc Mbah a Moute, Ryan Hollins, Baron Davis, Trevor Ariza, Jordan Farmar, Matt Barnes, Kevin Love, Earl Watson, and Russell Westbrook.

UCLA's three-year reign came to an end when Washington defeated Washington State, 67–60 to win the regular season Pac-10 title.

Darren Collison was named to the All-Pac-10 team; Josh Shipp was named to the second team; Alfred Aboya was honorable mention on the All-Pac-10 team; Jrue Holiday was named to the All-Freshman team; and Alfred Aboya and Darren Collison were named to the All-Defensive team.

Darren Collison was an honorable mention in the 2008–09 AP All-America basketball teams. Additionally, he was named the 2009 recipient of the Frances Pomeroy Naismith Award by the Naismith Memorial Basketball Hall of Fame. The award goes to the "nation's outstanding senior male collegian 6'0" and under who has excelled both athletically and academically."

In the NCAA National Championship tournament, Alfred Aboya scored two free-throw points with 48 seconds remaining in the game to help UCLA get by VCU in the first round at the East Regional in Philadelphia's Wachovia Center. Top scorers in the game were Eric Maynor (21) for VCU and Josh Shipp (16) for UCLA.

In the second round, with six Wildcats scoring double-digit points, Villanova ended UCLA's hope of going to the Final Four for the fourth time in a row. Dante Cunningham had 18 points; Reggie Redding and Corey Fisher had 13; Corey Stokes put up 12; eleven points came from Scottie Reynolds and ten points were put up by Dwayne Anderson for the winning team. Josh Shipp had 18 points and Alfred Aboya had 8 rebounds for UCLA.

On Friday, April 3, Alfred Aboya will play in the Hershey's all-star game, which is part of the kickoff celebration to Final Four weekend at Ford Field.

The team finished the season with an attendance of 392,980 in 35 games, averaging 11,228 fans per game.

Freshman guard Jrue Holiday announced on April 9 that he would make himself eligible for the NBA draft without signing with an agent.

Recruiting class
The incoming class of Jerime Anderson,  Drew Gordon, Jrue Holiday, Malcolm Lee, and J'Mison Morgan was ranked No. 1 in the nation.

Roster

Schedule

|-
!colspan=9 style=|Exhibition

|-
!colspan=9 style=|Non-Conference Season

|-
!colspan=9 style=| Conference Season

|-
!colspan=9 style=| Pac-10 Tournament

|-
!colspan=9 style=| NCAA tournament

Rankings

See also
 2008-09 NCAA Division I men's basketball rankings

Notes
 UCLA was swept by ASU for the first time since the 2002-03 season (and only the third time since ASU joined the Pac).
 UCLA only beat one ranked team (AP Top-25) this season: #19 Washington

References

UCLA Bruins men's basketball seasons
UCLA
UCLA
NCAA
NCAA